Marcel Henry Burgun was a French rugby union player. He was born on 30 January 1890, in St Petersburg, Russia and died on 2 September 1916 during the First World War.

He attended the École centrale Paris and entered the French artillery in 1914, then the nascent French air force in 1915, gaining the rank of "lieutenant ingénieur" and was killed in combat against the Germans. His brother was also killed in the conflict in 1914.

He received three decorations for bravery including a posthumous Croix de Guerre. He is buried in the  Mont Frenet, cemetery in the commune de La Cheppe (Marne).

Career

Club 
 SCUF : ?
 Racing club de France : Sporting club universitaire de France 1912
 Castres Olympique: 1912 to 1914

International
 Marcel Burgun had his first appearance on 20 March 1909 against the Ireland national rugby union team.

Past

Club 
 Vice-champion of France in 1912 (with Racing)

International

 11 appearances with the France national rugby union team
 1 in 1909, 3 in 1910, 2 in 1911, 2 in 1912, 2 in 1913, and 1 in 1914
 Participation in 5 finales of the Six Nations Championship, and a preliminary match against the Ireland national rugby union team in 1909.
 Played and won against the Scotland national rugby union team in 1911 in Paris.

References
 Godwin, Terry Complete Who's Who of International Rugby (Cassell, 1987)

External links
Fiche de joueur, sur ffr.fr
 

France international rugby union players
French rugby union players
Sportspeople from Saint Petersburg
1890 births
1916 deaths
French military personnel killed in World War I
Emigrants from the Russian Empire to France